Ibai Azurmendi Sagastibeltza (born 11 June 1996) is a Spanish cyclist who currently rides for UCI ProTeam .

Major results

Grand Tour general classification results timeline
Sources:

References

External links

1996 births
Living people
Spanish male cyclists
Cyclists from Navarre
People from Norte de Aralar